Lucara Diamond Corp. is a diamond exploration and mining company, founded in 2009 by two Canadian mining executives, Eira Thomas, Catherine McLeod-Seltzer and Swedish-Canadian mining billionaire Lukas Lundin, operating in Southern Africa but established in Canada. In November 2015, Lesedi La Rona, the world's second largest gem-quality diamond ever found, was found at the Karowe mine in Botswana.

Operations 

Lucara owned a 40% share of the AK6 kimberlite project (now the Karowe mine) in Botswana. In October 2010, Lucara bought African Diamonds, giving it a 100% share in the mine. The mine has an estimated $US2.2 billion of diamonds. AK6 is in the Orapa/Letlhakane district.

Other operations include the Mothae diamond project in Lesotho, where kimberlite processing began in June 2010, and where a 53.5 carat diamond has already been discovered; the Kavango project in Namibia; and planned mines and applications for mining licenses in Zimbabwe, Cameroon, and Botswana.

Noted stones 
On 18November 2015, the company announced the discovery of the Lesedi La Rona, the world's second largest gem-quality diamond ever (second only to the 3,106 carat Cullinan). The type IIa diamond was found in the company's Karowe mine in north-central Botswana. The diamond weighs 1,111 carat and measures . A day later, two more diamonds weighing 813 and 374 carat, were also found. All the stones came from the AK6 pipe opened 18 months earlier, it has since yielded over 1 million carats of diamonds. The company has sold the 813 carat Constellation in May 2016 for $63.1 million  and a 341.9 carat diamond in July 2015 for $20.6 million. The Lesedi has since sold for $53 million.

Company structure 
Chairman of the board since 2010 is Lukas Lundin, son of Adolf H. Lundin the founder of Lundin Mining and Lundin Petroleum. The president and CEO of Lucara is Eira Thomas. As of January 2020 over half of the company's executives, in Botswana and around the world, were women.

In March 2011, Lucara was reported to be discussing a merger with Gem Diamonds.

After the discovery of the Lesedi La Rona, the company's shares went up 28%.

See also
 List of largest rough diamonds

References

Companies listed on the Toronto Stock Exchange
Mining in Lesotho
Mining in Botswana
Mining companies of Canada
Non-renewable resource companies established in 2004
2004 establishments in British Columbia